Halina Mlynkova (born 22 June 1977 in Návsí) is a Polish singer originally from the Czech Republic. From 1998 to 2003, she was the vocalist of a popular Polish folk-rock group Brathanki.

She was born in Zaolzie, Cieszyn Silesia in the Polish family, as a daughter of Władysław and Anna Młynek. She graduated from Medical High School in Cieszyn and Jagiellonian University in Kraków.

She was married to Polish actor Łukasz Nowicki for nine years. They divorced on 25 May 2012. Łukasz and Halina have a son Piotr. Since February 2015 she is married to the Czech music producer Lešek Wronka. Mlynkova is a Lutheran.

Discography

Studio albums

Music videos

References 

Living people
1977 births
Polish Lutherans
Polish people from Zaolzie
People from Frýdek-Místek District
Mystic Production artists
Polish folk singers
Polish pop singers
21st-century Polish singers
21st-century Polish women singers